A by-election was held for the New South Wales Legislative Assembly electorate of the Clarence on 23 July 1863 because Clark Irving had been absent for an entire session without leave, having travelled to England seeking the foundation of a new Anglican Diocese of Grafton & Armidale.

Dates

Results

Clark Irving had been absent for an entire session without leave and was in England at the time of his nomination and the election.

See also
Electoral results for the district of Clarence
List of New South Wales state by-elections

References

1863 elections in Australia
New South Wales state by-elections
1860s in New South Wales